Ghani Global Holdings Limited, commonly known as Ghani Group, is a Pakistani conglomerate company headquartered in Lahore, Pakistan. It encompasses different business sectors: Mining, Glass, Dairy, Poultry and Automobiles.

Ownership
Ghani Group remains a family-owned business, as the descendants of the founder (from the Ghani Family) own a majority stake in the company. The current chairman of the Ghani Group of Companies is Aitzaz Ghani.

History 
Ghani Group of companies was founded in 1959 by Aitzaz Ghani as a trading company. It has operations in two countries Pakistan and UAE. The major Ghani Group of Companies are Ghani Mines, Ghani Halal Feed Mill, Ghani Glass, Ghani Dairies, and Ghani Automobile Industries.

In 1963, Ghani Mines (Pvt) Ltd was established.

In 1992, Ghani Glass Limited was established.

Subsidiaries 
 Ghani Mines
 Ghani Automobile Industries
 Ghani Gases
 Ghani Food Industries
 Ghani Dairies
 Ghani Halal Feed Mill
 Ghani Glass
 Ghani Himalayan Salt
 Ghani Layer Farms
 Ghani Ceramics
 Al Muhandus Corporation

References

Pakistani companies established in 1959
Conglomerate companies of Pakistan
Conglomerate companies established in 1959
Companies listed on the Pakistan Stock Exchange